"I Hate U" is a song by American singer SZA. It was released through Top Dawg Entertainment and RCA Records on December 3, 2021, as the second single from SZA's second studio album, SOS (2022). It was originally released on SoundCloud on August 22, 2021. "I Hate U" is an electro-R&B song with a "crunching", light instrumental, containing a relaxed, "ethereal" chorus, and hip hop-influenced verses.  A break-up song, it finds SZA detailing what went wrong in a past relationship, expressing resentment towards an ex-partner but acknowledging that she still misses them.

Upon the release of the song, it simultaneously debuted at number one on the United States Spotify and Apple Music streaming songs chart; and broke the record for the most streamed R&B song by a female artist on Apple Music in its first week. The song debuted at number seven on the US Billboard Hot 100 chart, becoming SZA's second song to debut in the top ten, while also debuting at number one on the Hot R&B/Hip-Hop Songs chart. It also reached the top 40 in Australia, Ireland, and the United Kingdom.

Background
The song was originally released exclusively on SZA's (anonymous) SoundCloud on August 22, 2021, along with two other tracks, "Joni" and "Nightbird". She revealed that her astrologist encouraged her to release the songs. After "I Hate U" received a warm response from fans and garnered viral popularity on video-sharing app TikTok, SZA decided to give it an official release, stating: "Honestly, this started out as an exercise. I just wanted somewhere to dump my thoughts without pressure. Y'all made it a thing and I'm not mad LMAO. Ask and you shall receive". However, after the song reached number one on US Apple Music, SZA revealed that the song is an official single, posting on social media: "One thing about y'all: y'all gon' make it a single even if it ain't! I love you! Thank you!  She also deemed the SoundCloud release an "experiment".

Composition and reception
Vultures Justin Curto labeled "I Hate U" a "groovy breakup song, anchored by SZA's lyrical directness", while Hayden Daviss of Pilerats found it a "subtle and seemingly 90s-indebted take on SZA's sound, with a crunching production swaying amongst SZA's vocal". HotNewHipHops Alexander Cole gave the song a "Very Hottttt" rating, complimenting the "dark production that complements the singer's voice perfectly", and noted, "throughout the track, she sings about a recent breakup and how she wishes things had played out differently". Ciaran Brennan of Hot Press said the song, along with "Joni" and "Nightbird", "showcases SZA's musical diversity", with the singer "switching up between passionate, emotional vocals and relaxed verses". Okayplayer's Robyn Mowat noted how the song "is filled with reflections on love, heartache and her headspace regarding a love gone wrong". NorthJersey.coms Jack McLoone deemed the track signature SZA, despite finding "her vocals on the chorus are more ethereal, while in the verses she skews closer to traditional R&B delivery with some clear hip hop influences. Naledi Ushe of PopSugar called it "a banger for all the heartbroken (past and present) people of the world". Comparing the song to Prince's "Eye Hate U" (1995), Jezebel writers said "a relaxed tempo and veritable yacht-rock keyboard underscore lovelorn 'fuck yous' and the overarching idea of hating someone because you love them so much". They noted however, that "despite the song's title, it is not a kiss-off but a call back, praising the "nimble" hook. Billboards Jason Lipshutz commended the song for showcasing "the vocal power that's made her such a captivating figure in mainstream pop and R&B". Similarly, HipHopDXs David Aaron Blake said, over the "wailing" synth and "lush" instrumental, is SZA's "uncontainable and booming voice".

Music video
A music video to accompany "I Hate U" was released on January 7, 2022. The visualizer, directed by Jack Begert, centers around a man (played by actor Lakeith Stanfield) in a heated argument on the phone. After the fiery phone call, he finds himself alone walking along the beach trying to light a cigarette and failing to do so. He then receives a text from SZA that reads "i hate u", prompting him to hurl his phone in the ocean. The video concludes with the words "Not The End", hinting at a possible follow-up.

Credits and personnel
Credits adapted via YouTube.

 Solána Rowe – composer, lyricist
 Robert Bisel – producer, composer, programmer
 Carter Lang – producer, composer, programmer
 Cody Fayne (ThankGod4Cody) – producer, composer, programmer
 Dylan Patrice – producer, composer, programmer

Charts

Weekly charts

Year-end charts

Certifications

Release history

References

2021 songs
SZA songs
Songs written by SZA
Electro songs
American contemporary R&B songs
Top Dawg Entertainment singles
RCA Records singles